"Raining Again" is a song by American electronica musician Moby. It was released as the second single from his seventh studio album Hotel in mainland Europe on May 23, 2005 by Mute Records and in Australia on June 6, 2005 by EMI Music Australia.

Track listing 
 CD single 
 "Raining Again"  – 3:30
 "It's OK" – 3:53
 "Put the Headphones On" – 3:49
 "Raining Again"  – 7:41
 "Raining Again"  – 6:55
 "Raining Again"  – 3:48
 12-inch single 
 "Raining Again"  – 6:55
 "Raining Again"  – 7:07
 "Raining Again"  – 7:07
 Digital single
 "Raining Again"  – 3:30
 "It's OK" – 3:53
 "Put the Headphones On" – 3:49
 "Raining Again"  – 7:41
 "Raining Again"  – 6:55
 "Raining Again"  – 7:07
 "Raining Again"  – 6:37
 "Raining Again"  – 6:45

Charts

References

External links
 

Moby songs
2005 singles
2005 songs
Songs written by Moby
Mute Records singles